Elections in Turkey are held for six functions of government: presidential elections (national), parliamentary elections (national), municipality mayors (local), district mayors (local), provincial or municipal council members (local) and muhtars (local). Apart from elections, referendums are also held occasionally.

The Parliament (Meclis) has 600 members, elected for a five-year term by a system based on closed list proportional representation according to the D'Hondt method. Political parties are subject to an electoral threshold of 7%. Smaller parties can avoid the electoral threshold by forming an alliance with bigger parties, in which it is sufficient that total votes of the alliance passes the 7%. Independent candidates are not subject to electoral threshold.

The presidential elections are held every five years. The president is elected for a term of office of five years and is eligible for one re-election. There's an exception when a president's second term ends prematurely through a decision of the Parliament. In this case, the president can be re-elected for a third term.

To put forward a referendum regarding constitutional amendments, a supermajority (three fifths of the votes) in the parliament is required first. These kinds of referendums are binding.

Turkey has a multi-party system, with two or three strong parties and often a fourth party that is electorally successful. Since 1950, parliamentary politics has mainly been dominated by conservative parties. Even the ruling Justice and Development Party (AKP) tends to identify itself with the "tradition" of Democrat Party (DP). While on the left side of the spectrum, parties like Republican People's Party (CHP), Social Democratic Populist Party (SHP) and Democratic Left Party (DSP) have enjoyed the largest electoral success on the left.

The constitutional referendum of 2017 enhanced the powers of the president, and since 2018, the focus has shifted from parliamentary to the presidential elections.

Schedule 

 Bold: latest elections, italic: upcoming elections

List of elections

Presidential elections

 1950 Turkish presidential election, Celâl Bayar succeeded İsmet İnönü
 1954 Turkish presidential election, Celâl Bayar re-elected
 1957 Turkish presidential election, Celâl Bayar re-elected
 1961 Turkish presidential election, after the 1961 Coup, Cemal Gürsel was elected president.
 1966 Turkish presidential election, Cevdet Sunay succeeded Cemal Gürsel
 1973 Turkish presidential election, Fahri Korutürk succeeded Cevdet Sunay
 1980 Turkish presidential election, parties failed to elect a president to succeed Fahri Korutürk, 1980 Turkish coup d'état ensued
 1982 Turkish constitutional referendum, Kenan Evren named president in new constitution until 1989
 1989 Turkish presidential election, Turgut Özal succeeded Kenan Evren
 1993 Turkish presidential election, Süleyman Demirel succeeded Turgut Özal
 2000 Turkish presidential election, Ahmet Necdet Sezer succeeded Süleyman Demirel
 2007 Turkish presidential election, Abdullah Gül succeeded Ahmet Necdet Sezer
 2014 Turkish presidential election, Recep Tayyip Erdoğan succeeded Abdullah Gül
 2018 Turkish presidential election, Recep Tayyip Erdoğan re-elected

Parliamentary elections
The following sections give list of key results.

At first, Turkey had a unicameral legislature, with the main chamber being the Grand National Assembly of Turkey. This lasted until 1961, when the new Constitution of 1961 replaced the previous unicameral (one house) system with a bicameral (two house) one. The Grand National Assembly was downgraded to the position of the lower house whilst the newly founded Senate of the Republic became the upper house. However, the constitution of 1982 abolished the Senate and Turkey once again adopted a unicameral system.

Results summary of the past elections
 1923 Turkish general election – June 28, 1923
 1927 Turkish general election – 2nd round: July 27, 1927 – MP election: September 1, 1927
 1931 Turkish general election – April 25, 1931 – Total: 317
 CHP: 287 seats
 Independent: 30 seats
 1935 Turkish general election – February 8, 1935
 1939 Turkish general election – March 26, 1939
 1943 Turkish general election – February 28, 1943
 1946 Turkish general election – July 21, 1946 – Total: 465
 CHP: 396 seats
 DP: 62 seats
 Independent: 7 seats

 1950 Turkish general election – May 14, 1950 – Total: 487
 DP: 408 seats
 CHP:  69 seats
 CMP: 1 seat
 Independent: 9 seats

 1954 Turkish general election – May 2, 1954 – Total: 541
 DP: 502 seats
 CHP: 31 seats
 CMP: 5 seats
 Independent: 3 seats

 1957 Turkish general election – October 27, 1957 – Total: 610
 DP: 424 seats
 CHP: 178 seats
 CMP: 4 seats
 HP: 4 seats

 1961 Turkish general election – October 15, 1961 – Total: 450
 CHP: 173 seats
 AP: 158 seats
 YTP: 65 seats
 CMKP: 54 seats

 1965 Turkish general election – October 10, 1965 – Total: 450
 AP: 240 seats
 CHP: 134 seats
 MP: 31 seats
 YTP: 19 seats
 TİP: 14 seats
 CMKP: 11 seats
 Independent: 1 seat

 1969 Turkish general election – October 12, 1969 – Total: 450
 AP: 256 seats
 CHP: 143 seats
 GP: 15 seats
 BP: 8 seats
 MP: 6 seats
 YTP: 6 seats
 TİP: 2 seats
 MHP: 1 seat
 Independent: 13 seats

 1973 Turkish general election – October 14, 1973 – Total: 450
 CHP: 185 seats
 AP: 149 seats
 MSP: 48 seats
 DP: 45 seats
 CGP: 13 seats
 MHP: 3 seats
 TBP: 1 seats
 Independent: 6

 1977 Turkish general election – June 5, 1977 – Total: 450
 CHP: 213 seats
 AP: 189 seats
 MSP: 24 seats
 MHP: 16 seats
 CGP: 3 seats
 DP: 1 seat
 Independent: 4 seats

 1983 Turkish general election – November 6, 1983 – Total: 399
 ANAP: 211 seats
 HP: 117 seats
 MDP: 71 seats

 1987 Turkish general election – November 29, 1987 – Total: 450
 ANAP: 292 seats
 SHP: 99 seats
 DYP: 59 seats

 1991 Turkish general election – October 20, 1991 – Total: 450
 DYP: 178 seats
 ANAP: 115 seats
 SHP: 88 seats
 RP: 62 seats
 DSP: 7 seats

 1995 Turkish general election – December 24, 1995 – Total: 550
 RP: 158 seats
 DYP: 135 seats
 ANAP: 132 seats
 DSP: 76 seats
 SHP: 49 seats

 1999 Turkish general election – April 18, 1999 – Total: 550
 DSP: 136 seats
 MHP: 129 seats
 FP: 111 seats
 ANAP: 86 seats
 DYP: 85 seats
 Independent: 3 seats

 2002 Turkish general election – November 3, 2002 – Total: 555
 AK Party: 363 seats
 CHP: 178 seats
 Independent: 9 seats

 2007 Turkish general election – July 22, 2007 – Total: 550
 AK Party: 341 seats
 CHP: 112 seats
 MHP: 71 seats
 Independent: 26 seats (included 20 members of the Democratic Society Party)

 2011 Turkish general election – June 12, 2011 – Total: 550
 AK Party: 327 seats
 CHP: 135 seats
 MHP: 53 seats
 Independent: 35 seats (included 29 members of the Peace and Democracy Party)

 June 2015 Turkish general election – June 7, 2015 – Total: 550
 AK Party: 258 seats
 CHP: 132 seats
 MHP: 80 seats
 HDP: 80 seats

 November 2015 Turkish general election – November 1, 2015 – Total: 550
 AK Party: 317 seats
 CHP: 134 seats
 HDP: 59 seats
 MHP: 40 seats

 2018 Turkish parliamentary election, as part of the 2018 Turkish general election – June 24, 2018 – Total: 600
 AK Party: 295 seats
 CHP: 146 seats
 HDP: 67 seats
 MHP: 49 seats
 İYİ: 43 seats

Senate elections 1961–80

Local elections
The Turkish administrative system defines three different district types for local elections: villages, cities and metropolitan cities. The difference between cities and metropolitan cities derives from the size of the population. Cities with more than 750,000 residents are labeled as metropolitan cities while the rest are simply called cities. There are 31 metropolitan cities and 50 cities across Turkey, and voters in both will have a total of four votes. Depending on the type of area the citizen lives, he or she has the opportunity to cast vote for the following offices:

People living in metropolitan cities:
 Metropolitan municipality mayor
 District mayor
 Municipal council members
 Muhtar

People living in cities:
 Mayor 
 Municipal council members
 Provincial assembly members 
 Muhtar

People living in villages:
 Provincial assembly members
 Muhtar

The following is a summary of the past local elections.

 1930 Turkish local elections
 CHP: 502 municipalities
 SCF: 40 municipalities
 1934 Turkish local elections
 1938 Turkish local elections
 1942 Turkish local elections
 1946 Turkish local elections
 CHP: 54.65%
 DP: 43.35%
 1950 Turkish local elections – September 3, 1950
 DP: 560 municipalities
 CHP: 40 municipalities
 1955 Turkish local elections
 1963 Turkish local elections – November 17, 1963
 AP: 45.48%
 CHP: 36.22%
 YTP: 6.51%
 MP: 3.09%
 CKMP: 3.06%
 TİP: 0.4%
 ...others
 1968 Turkish local elections – June 2, 1968
 AP: 49.06%
 CHP: 27.9%
 GP: 6.62%
 MP: 3.5%
 TİP: 2.72%
 BP: 1.64%
 ...others
 1973 Turkish local elections – December 9, 1973
 CHP: 37.09%
 AP: 32.32%
 DP: 10.75%
 MSP: 6.2%
 CGP: 2.9%
 MHP: 1.33%
 ...others
 1977 Turkish local elections – December 11, 1977
 CHP: 41.73%
 AP: 37.1%
 MSP: 6.91%
 MHP: 6.62%
 DP: 1.0%
 ...others
 1984 Turkish local elections – March 25, 1984
 ANAP: 41.52%
 SODEP: 23.35%
 DYP: 13.25%
 HP: 8.76%
 MDP: 7.09%
 RP: 4.4%
 Independent: 1.63%
 1989 Turkish local elections – March 26, 1989
 SHP: 28.69%
 DYP: 25.13%
 ANAP: 21.8%
 RP: 9.8%
 DSP: 9.03%
 MHP: 4.14%
 ...others
 1994 Turkish local elections – March 27, 1994
 DYP: 21.41%
 ANAP: 21.09%
 RP: 19.14%
 SHP: 13.53%
 DSP: 8.75%
 MHP: 7.95%
 CHP: 4.61%
 ...others
 1999 Turkish local elections – April 18, 1999
 DSP: 18.7%
 MHP: 17.17%
 FP: 16.48%
 ANAP: 15.03%
 DYP: 13.21%
 CHP: 11.08%
 ...others
 2004 Turkish local elections – March 28, 2004
 AKP: 41.6%
 CHP: 18.2%
 MHP: 10.4%
 DYP: 9.9%
 2009 Turkish local elections – March 22, 2009
 AKP: 38.99%
 CHP: 23.23%
 MHP: 16.13%
 ...others
 2014 Turkish local elections – March 30, 2014
 AKP: 43.31%
 CHP: 25.59%
 MHP: 17.63%
 ...others
 2019 Turkish local elections – March 31, 2019
 AKP: 44.32%
 CHP: 30.10%
 İYİ: 7.45%
 ...others

By-elections
If too many seats become vacant in the parliament or if elections in a district is not properly conducted, then a by-election is required to take place. 
 1936 Turkish parliamentary by-elections
 1945 Turkish parliamentary by-elections
 1947 Turkish parliamentary by-elections
 1948 Turkish parliamentary by-elections
 1949 Turkish parliamentary by-elections
 1951 Turkish parliamentary by-elections
 1966 Turkish parliamentary by-elections
 1968 Turkish parliamentary by-elections
 1975 Turkish parliamentary by-elections
 1979 Turkish parliamentary by-elections
 1986 Turkish parliamentary by-elections
 2003 Turkish parliamentary by-elections

Referendums

Voter turnout
The voter turnout for the average of 18 parliamentary election is 81.4%; of the local elections is 78.7% and of the referendums is 83.1%. Turkey relatively has a high voter turnout rate comparing to modern democracies. The participation rate in Turkey is also higher than the participation rates in countries where compulsory voting is loosely applied. With the exception of 1960–1970, voter turnout rate in Turkey is above the world average from 1950 to the present in Turkey.

See also
 Electoral cycle of Turkey
 List of Cabinets of Turkey
 Electoral calendar
 Electoral system
 Parliamentary terms of Turkey
 Government of Turkey

References

External links
 Elections in Turkey - Organization for Security and Co-operation in Europe (OSCE)
 Supreme Election Council